Sweden will compete at the 2022 European Championships in Munich from August 11 to August 22, 2022.

Medallists

Competitors
The following is the list of number of competitors in the Championships:

Athletics

Beach Volleyball

Sweden has qualified 1 male pair.

Gymnastics

Sweden has entered 5 men and 4 women.

Men

Qualification

Women

Qualification

Table tennis

Triathlon

Relay

References

2022
Nations at the 2022 European Championships
European Championships